Kentucky Route 100 (KY 100) originates at a junction with U.S.. Highway 79 in Russellville in Logan County.  The route continues through Simpson County, Allen County and Monroe County to terminate at a junction with KY 90 near Waterview in Cumberland County.

According to the Caves, Lakes, and Corvettes regional brochure, the entire KY 100 corridor is considered a Kentucky Scenic Byway.

History
Kentucky Route 100 was one out of many charter state highways when the statewide system of state highways began in the late 1920s into 1930. It originally went through unincorporated small communities such as Leslie and Arat.
 
However, at some time between 1945 and 1958, KY 100's final few miles and its eastern terminus were both rerouted to its current location with another intersection with KY 90 at Waterview, further west of Burkesville. KY 1205 and most of KY 691 are the current designations for the original KY 100 ending. The remaining parts of the original alignment in western Cumberland County are either no longer existing (especially the originally unpaved section) or it still does, but is now maintained by the Cumberland County Road Department.

In 2015, KY 100's western terminus was re-located to end at the crossroads intersection with U.S. Route 68 and US 68 Business on the east side of Russellville. This was done to reduce car accidents at the original west terminus, which was also where US 79's northern terminus was originally located.

Major intersections

Related routes

Kentucky Route 100 Truck

Kentucky Route 100 Truck (KY 100 Truck) is the truck route of KY 100 in Franklin, in Simpson County. It follows the KY 1008 beltway bypassing downtown Franklin to the south. This includes the first  of KY 1008.

References

External links
 
 
 
 
 
KY 100 at Kentucky Roads

0100
0100
0100
0100
0100
0100